Tang Chao may refer to:

 Tang dynasty, or Tang Chao in Chinese
 Tang Dynasty (band), Chinese band
 Tang Chao (physicist), Chinese physicist